Durbe Station is a railway station on the Jelgava – Liepāja Railway.

References 

Railway stations in Latvia
Railway stations opened in 1929
Railway stations closed in 2001